The High Commissioner of Australia to the Solomon Islands is an officer of the Australian Department of Foreign Affairs and Trade and the head of the High Commission of the Commonwealth of Australia to the Solomon Islands. The position has the rank and status of an Ambassador Extraordinary and Plenipotentiary and is based with the High Commission on the corner of Hibiscus Avenue and Mud Alley, Honiara.

The High Commissioner since January 2020 has been Lachlan Strahan. The Solomon Islands and Australia have had diplomatic relations since 1982, following the independence of Solomon Islands on 7 July 1978.

List of High Commissioners

Notes 
: On 12 September 2006 the Australian High Commissioner was declared persona non grata by the Solomon Islands Government alleging that he was "talking too much to the opposition," and had been expressing his opposition to a government-appointed commission of inquiry into recent civil unrest.

See also
Australia–Solomon Islands relations
Foreign relations of Australia

References

External links
 Australian High Commission, Honiara

 
Solomon Islands
Australia